Sin-Eribam ruled the ancient Near East Amorite city-state of Larsa for only two years, from c. 1778 BC to 1776 BC (short chronology).

See also

Chronology of the ancient Near East

Notes

External links
Sin-Eribam Year Names at CDLI

Amorite kings
18th-century BC Sumerian kings
Kings of Larsa
18th-century BC people